Bath may refer to: 
 Bathing, immersion in a fluid
 Bathtub, a large open container for water, in which a person may wash their body
 Public bathing, a public place where people bathe
 Thermae, ancient Roman public bathing facilities

Places 

 Bath, Somerset, a city and World Heritage Site in the south-west of England, UK

 Bath (UK Parliament constituency)
 Bath, Barbados, a populated place
 Bath, New Brunswick, Canada
 Bath, Ontario, Canada
 Bath, Jamaica, a town and mineral spring in Saint Thomas Parish, Jamaica
 Bath, Netherlands
 Bath Island, a neighbourhood in Saddar Town, Pakistan

United States 

 Bath, California
 Bath, Georgia
 Bath, Illinois
 Bath, Indiana
 Bath, Kentucky
 Bath County, Kentucky
 Bath, Maine
 Bath Iron Works, in the above city
 Bath, Michigan
 Bath, New Hampshire
 Bath, New York, a town
 Bath (village), New York, village within the town of Bath
 Bath, North Carolina
 Bath Historic District (Bath, North Carolina)
 Bath, Pennsylvania
 Bath, South Carolina
 Bath, South Dakota
 Bath County, Virginia
 Bath, West Virginia, more commonly known by the name of its post office, Berkeley Springs
 Bath Mountain, a mountain in California
 Bath Township (disambiguation)

Sport 
 Bath Rugby, a professional rugby union club in the English city
 Bath City F.C., a semi-professional football club based in Bath, Somerset

Organisations 
 University of Bath, UK

People 
 Bath (surname)

Titles of Nobility 
 Earl of Bath
 Marquess of Bath

Other 
 Bath (unit), a unit of liquid volume used by the ancient Hebrews
 Bath (quantum mechanics), a method of describing the environment in an open quantum system
 Bath (album), an album by maudlin of the Well
 Baths (musician), an electronic music artist
 Bath Profile, an international Z39.50 specification

See also 
 Baath (disambiguation)
 Baden (disambiguation), the equivalent German placename
 The Bath (disambiguation)
 Bath bun
 Bath County (disambiguation)
 Bath Historic District (disambiguation)
 Bath salts
 Bath Spa (disambiguation)
 Bath treatment (fishkeeping)
 Bathurst (disambiguation)
 Bird bath
 Order of the Bath, a British order of chivalry founded by George I